The Portuguese arrived in the Kingdom of Kotte in 1505. By 1551, they had appointed a captain-major to control the Portuguese occupied territory called Ceylon on the island of modern-day Sri Lanka. In that time, there were numerous captains-major until 1594. The post of captain-major was preceded by that of the captain in 1518. In 1594, the captain-major was replaced with a governor.

List of captain-majors

See also
 List of monarchs of Sri Lanka
 List of captains of Portuguese Ceylon
 List of captain-generals of Portuguese Ceylon
 History of Sri Lanka

References
 List of heads of state of Sri Lanka at worldstatesmen.org

Captain-majors of Ceilão
Ceilao
Ceilao
Ceilao
1551 establishments in Asia
16th-century establishments in Sri Lanka
1591 disestablishments in Asia
16th-century disestablishments in Sri Lanka
1551 establishments in the Portuguese Empire